Annerly Poulos (born 8 January 2003) is an Australian junior tennis player.

Poulos has a career high ITF combined junior ranking of 64, achieved on 7 January 2019.

Poulos made her WTA main draw debut at the 2019 Hobart International in the doubles event, partnering Alison Bai.

Poulos is Mixed-race, being the daughter of a Greek father and a Samoan mother.

References

External links 
 
 
 

2003 births
Living people
Australian female tennis players
Sportspeople from Canberra
Tennis people from the Australian Capital Territory
Australian people of Greek descent
Australian sportspeople of Samoan descent
21st-century Australian women